Great Mission may refer to:

Great Mission Teacher Training Institute, Delhi
Great Mission Public School, group of co-educational schools run by Prabhas Educational and Welfare Society in New Delhi, India 
"Great Mission", song from You Gotta Say Yes to Another Excess